Wolfgang Golther (25 May 1863 – 14 December 1945) was a German philologist who specialized in Germanic studies. A professor at the University of Rostock, Golther was a prominent authority on Medieval German literature and Germanic religion.

Biography
Wolfgang Golther was born in Stuttgart, Germany on 25 May 1863, the son of Ludwig von Golther (1823-1876) and Fanny Autenrieth. His father was a prominent public official in the Kingdom of Württemberg. The family was Protestant.

Golther gained his abitur in Stuttgart in 1881. In 1882-1883 he served in the German Army. Since 1882, Golther studied Germanic philology and Romance languages and literature at the Ludwig Maximilian University of Munich. He gained his Ph.D. in Munich in 1886 with a thesis on The Song of Roland. He habilitated at Munich in 1888 with a thesis on Tristan and Iseult.

Golther served as a lecturer in Germanic philology at Munich from 1885 to 1895. From 1885 to 1934, Golther was Professor of German and Modern Literature at the University of Rostock. During this time he also served as Director of the German-Philological Seminar (1895-1934), Dean (1902-1903), Senior Librarian (1907-1934), Rector (1909-1910) and Vice Rector (1910-1911). He received the Bavarian Maximilian Order for Science and Art in 1912.

Golther retired from Rostock in 1934, but continued to be affiliated with the University as Honorary Professor of German Philology. He received the Goethe-Medaille für Kunst und Wissenschaft in 1939. Golther died in Rostock on 14 December 1945.

Selected works
 Deutsche Heldensage. Ehlermann, Berlin/ Dresden/ Leipzig 1894, .
 Der Nibelunge Nôt, Sammlung Göschen, Leipzig 1907
 Die deutsche Dichtung im Mittelalter. Metzler Stuttgart 1912. (Marix Verlag, Wiesbaden 2005)
 Germanische Götter und Heldensagen. (Fourier, Wiesbaden 2003)
 Handbuch der Germanischen Mythologie 1908. (Marix Verlag, Wiesbaden 2004)
 Zur deutschen Sage und Dichtung: gesammelte Aufsätze. Behr, Berlin/ Leipzig 1914.
 Richard Wagner – Leben und Lebenswerk – Musikerbiographie. Reclam-Verlag, 1926.
 als Hrsg.: Heinrich von Kleist: Robert Guiskard, Herzog der Normänner. Reclam-Verlag, Stuttgart 1964, .
 Parzival in der deutschen Literatur. 1929, .
 Tristan und Isolde in der französischen und deutschen Dichtung des Mittelalters und der Neuzeit. de Gruyter, Berlin/ Leipzig 1929, .
 Geschichte der deutschen Literatur Vol. 1. Von den ersten Anfängen bis zum Ausgang des Mittelalters, von Wolfgang Golther.- Vol. 2. Seit dem Ausgang des Mittelalters, von Karl Borinski

Sources

 

1863 births
1945 deaths
Academic staff of the University of Rostock
German medievalists
German philologists
Germanic studies scholars
Germanists
Ludwig Maximilian University of Munich alumni
People from Stuttgart
Old Norse studies scholars
Writers on Germanic paganism